Campyloneurus is a genus of wasps in the subfamily Braconinae. Species are found in Southern Africa, Australia and Far East Asia.

References 

 Neue Braconiden aus Ungarn. G Szépligeti, 1900
 Beitrage zur Kenntnis der ungarischen Ichneumoniden. II. G Szépligeti, Természetrajzi Füzetek, 1900

External links 
 

 
 Campyloneurus at insectoid.info

Braconidae genera
Braconinae